Jealousy is a 2013 French drama film directed by Philippe Garrel, starring Louis Garrel and Anna Mouglalis. It was screened in the main competition section at the 70th Venice International Film Festival. It is the first installment in Garrel's trilogy of love, the second being In the Shadow of Women (2015) and the third being Lover for a Day (2017).

Plot
An impoverished actor Louis tries to make his girlfriend Claudia a big star. But in spite of all his efforts he cannot get her proper roles. Eventually she falls in love with another man and cheats on him.

Cast
 Louis Garrel as Louis 
 Anna Mouglalis as Claudia 
 Rebecca  as Clothilde 
 Olga Milshtein as Charlotte 
 Esther Garrel as Esther 
 Arthur Igual as the friend of Louis 
 Jérôme Huguet as Antoine 
 Manon Kneusé as Lucie

Release
The film had its world premiere in the Competition section at the 70th Venice International Film Festival on 5 September 2013. It was released in France on 4 December 2013.

Reception
On review aggregator website Rotten Tomatoes, the film has an approval rating of 73% based on 26 reviews, and an average rating of 6.35/10. On Metacritic, the film has a weighted average score of 66 out of 100, based on 17 critics, indicating "generally favorable reviews".

Kimber Myers of IndieWire gave the film a grade of B, writing: "While it features characters making unrelatable decisions, this 77-minute film is nonetheless compelling and beautifully constructed, and will be of particular interest for fans of French cinema." Boyd van Hoeij of The Hollywood Reporter wrote: "Acting is low-key but believable throughout, with Mouglalis finally shedding her supermodel looks to show the contradictory and flawed but very human character underneath." Leslie Felperin of Variety called it "slight but watchable".

Cahiers du cinéma named it the seventh best film of 2013.

References

External links
 

2013 films
2013 drama films
French drama films
2010s French-language films
French black-and-white films
Films directed by Philippe Garrel
2010s French films